Silent Youth is a 2012 German gay drama film written and directed by Diemo Kemmesies.

Cast 
 Martin Bruchmann as Marlo
 Josef Mattes as Kirill
 Linda Schüle as Franzi
 Mathias Neubert as Father
 Anurag as bagtit

Participation in international festivals 
2012:
 Festival Internacional de Cine de Valencia Cinema Jove (Spain)
 Hof International Film Festival (Germany) – German premiere 19 October 2012
 MOLODIST international film festival – Kiev (Ukraine)
 Pink Screens (Belgium)
 Torino Film Festival (Italy)
 Q! Film Festival 2012 – Jakarta (Indonesia)

2013:
 15º Festival de invierno (Uruguay)
 16. Pink Apple (Switzerland)
 Achtung Berlin (Germany)
 Human Rights Film Festival of Barcelona (Spain)
 Iris Prize Festival – Cardiff (UK)
 Philadelphia QFest (USA)
 Portobello Film Festival – London (UK)
 Queer Lisboa 17 – International Queer Film Festival (Portugal)

2014:
 Berlin Art Film Festival (Germany)
 Festival International de Cine LGBT El Lugar Sin Limites (Ecuador)
 Honolulu Rainbow Film Festival (USA)
 Out Twin Cities Film Festival – Minnesota (USA)
 Seattle Lesbian & Gay Film Festival (USA)
 Queer Filmfestival (Germany)

References

External links 
 
 

2012 films
German LGBT-related films
2010s German-language films
2012 LGBT-related films
LGBT-related drama films
2012 drama films
German drama films
2010s German films